In fluid dynamics, Bickley jet is a steady two-dimensional laminar plane jet with large jet Reynolds number emerging into the fluid at rest, named after W. G. Bickley, who gave the analytical solution in 1937, to the problem derived by Schlichting in 1933 and the corresponding problem in axisymmetric coordinates is called as Schlichting jet. The solution is valid only for distances far away from the jet origin.

Flow description
Consider a steady plane emerging into the same fluid, a type of submerged jets from a narrow slit, which is supposed to be very small (such that the fluid loses memory of the shape and size of the slit far away from the origin, it remembers only the net momentum flux). Let the velocity be  in Cartesian coordinate and the axis of the jet be  axis with origin at the orifice. The flow is self-similar for large Reynolds number (the jet is so thin that  varies much more rapidly in the transverse  direction than the streamwise  direction) and can be approximated with boundary layer equations.

where  is the kinematic viscosity and the pressure is everywhere equal to the outside fluid pressure.
Since the fluid is at rest far away from the center of the jet

and because the flow is symmetric about  axis

is a constant, where  which also constant for incompressible flow.

Proof of constant axial momentum flux 

The constant momentum flux condition can be obtained by integrating the momentum equation across the jet.

where  is used to simplify the above equation. This can be easily verified by integrating the continuity equation across the boundary layer.

where symmetry condition  is used.

Self-similar solution

The self-similar solution is obtained by introducing the transformation

the equation reduces to

while the boundary conditions become

The exact solution is given by

where  is solved from the following equation

Letting

 

the velocity is given by

See also
 Landau–Squire jet

References 

Flow regimes
Fluid dynamics